"F.A.M.E." (abbreviation for Fake Ass Motherfuckers Envy) is a song by American hip hop recording artist Young Jeezy, released on October 11, 2011, as the third single from his fourth studio album Thug Motivation 103: Hustlerz Ambition (2011). The song features fellow Atlanta-based rapper T.I. and was produced by production team J.U.S.T.I.C.E. League, who sampled "Air for Life" as performed by Above & Beyond with Andy Moor as well as "You and Love are the Same" as performed by The Grass Roots.

Music video
On November 16, 2011, behind-the-scenes footage of the music video was released. The music video, directed by Lance Drake, was released on November 18, 2011.

Charts

Release history

References

2011 singles
T.I. songs
Jeezy songs
Songs written by T.I.
Songs written by Jeezy
Song recordings produced by J.U.S.T.I.C.E. League
Songs written by Erik Ortiz
Songs written by Kevin Crowe